Plurality or multiplicity is the psychological phenomenon in which a body can feature multiple distinct or overlapping consciousnesses, each with their own degree of individuality. This phenomenon can feature in identity disturbance, dissociative identity disorder, and other specified dissociative disorders. Some individuals describe their experience of plurality as a form of neurodiversity, rather than something that demands a diagnosis. There are a number of ways that the phenomenon is conceptualized and discussed among members of associated online subcultures, including dissociative disorders and spiritual and cultural practices such as tulpamancy. Among members of these subcultures, distinct consciousnesses are often termed "headmates", "alters", "parts", or "selves", with terms for a group of headmates including "system", "collective", and others. One who does not experience plurality is typically called a "singlet".

In personality research, plurality can also be referred to as a personality style defined as "an individual's relatively consistent inclinations and preferences across contexts".

It has been said by journalists and experts in psychology that plurality is significantly under-researched and often misrepresented in the media.

History

Throughout history, concepts of phantoms, muses, and fluid "selves" have been applied to this phenomenon. This has been extended to concepts such as tulpamancy. Additionally, some individuals throughout history have stated that they had been taken over by a spirit, soul, or ghost.

Science writer Rita Carter says that Italian psychologist Roberto Assagioli developed psychosynthesis, and hypothesized that an individual may not be consciously aware of their many personae. American psychologist John G. Watkins used hypnosis to bring out different personalities.

In modern times
Communities of individuals who identify as "systems" of multiple distinct personalities, often called "headmates" or "alters" or similar terms, have emerged as recently as the 1980s. Headmates often describe themselves as having different names, ages, genders, sexualities, and mental appearances from both one another and from their body. Some may request the usage of different names or different pronouns when addressing them. Others may want to use a shared collective name. Different headmates may have different opinions, worldviews, desires, ideas, relationships, and perspectives from one another, with it being preferred by most pluralities to treat different headmates as different people.

More recently, communities of systems have formed online both through independent information sites such as Astraea's Web and social media sites such as TikTok. Though the exact terminology used varies, some common nomenclature has been coined by systems describing their experiences, including "fronting" (when a given headmate or alter assumes control of their body) "switching," (when headmates change places in the "front") and "headspace" (an "inner world" which systems describe as a mental space where headmates interact with each other).

It is often argued both by systems and experts in psychology that plurality is a valid response to trauma  , and that to refuse to socially recognize a system as multiple individuals, or attempt to treat it with the aim of having the multiple personalities present as one (a process often known in communities of systems as "integration"), often does more harm than good. However, others dispute this, expressing skepticism towards the possibility of a "functional" system, and saying that Dissociative identity disorder (DID) and related conditions in which plurality may feature should be recognized as a disorder and treated appropriately.

Plurality in Personality Research

Stephen Braude and Rita Carter use a different definition of personality style, defining "personality style" as "personality" and proposing that a person may have multiple selves and not have any relatively consistent inclinations and preferences in personality. This may happen as an adaptation to a change of environment and role within a person's life and may be consciously adopted or encouraged, in a similar way to acting or role-playing.  For example, a woman may adopt a kind, nurturing personality when dealing with her children but change to a more aggressive, forceful personality when going to work as a high-flying executive as her responsibilities change.

See also
 Demonic possession#Medicine and psychology
 Hypostatic model of personality
 Personality style
 Subpersonality

References

Further reading

External links
MoreThanOne.info, an information page on plurality

Personality typologies